The lesser bird-of-paradise (Paradisaea minor) is a bird-of-paradise in the genus Paradisaea.

Description
The lesser bird-of-paradise is medium-sized, up to 32 cm-long, maroon-brown with a yellow crown and brownish-yellow upper back. The male has a dark emerald-green throat, a pair of long tail-wires and is adorned with ornamental flank plumes which are deep yellow at their base and fade outwards into white. The female is a maroon bird with a dark-brown head and whitish underparts. Further study is required, but it seems likely that birds-of-paradise also possess toxins in their skins, derived from their insect prey.

It resembles the larger greater bird-of-paradise, but the male of that species has a dark chest, whereas the female is entirely brown (no whitish underparts).

Breeding
The males are polygamous, and perform courtship displays in leks. The female usually lays two pinkish eggs with dark markings in a nest in a tree high above ground. Its diet consists mainly of fruits and insects.

Distribution
The lesser bird-of-paradise is distributed throughout forests of northern New Guinea, and the nearby islands of Misool and Yapen. Widespread and common throughout its large range, the lesser bird-of-paradise is evaluated as Least Concern on the IUCN Red List of Threatened Species. It is listed on Appendix II of CITES.

References

External links
 BirdLife Species Factsheet
 Lesser bird-of-paradise at WWF

lesser bird-of-paradise
Birds of New Guinea
lesser bird-of-paradise
Taxa named by George Shaw